
The following substances have been commonly used in homeopathy. See :Category:Homeopathic remedies for a list of other notable preparations.

See also 

 Bach flower remedies

References